Platyphora testudo is a species of broad-shouldered leaf beetles belonging to the Chrysomelidae family. This species can be found in Panama and Ecuador.

References
 Zipcodezoo
 Husband, Robert Wayne, 1999: A new species of Chrysomelobia (Acari: Podapolipidae) from Platyphora testudo (Demay) (Coleoptera: Chrysomelidae) from Peru, with a key to known species of the genus - International Journal of Acarology

Chrysomelinae
Beetles described in 1838